El Mo'alla is a town in Upper Egypt located about 35 km south of Luxor, on the east bank of the Nile.

Known as Hefat by ancient Egyptians, it served as a necropolis for the nearby city of Djerty (nowadays El-Tod) since the early First Intermediate Period. Two rock-cut tombs within it, datable to this period, are particularly remarkable because of their decorations, that of the two nomarchs Ankhtifi and Sobekhotep.

References

External links

 Egyptsites page on el-Mo'alla

Towns in Egypt
Populated places in Luxor Governorate